is a railway station in the town of Ikeda, Ibi District, Gifu Prefecture, Japan, operated by the private railway operator Yōrō Railway.

Lines

Station layout
Ikeno Station has two opposed ground-level side platforms connected by a level crossing. The station is unattended.

Platforms

Adjacent stations

|-
!colspan=5|Yōrō Railway

History
Ikeno Station opened on July 31, 1913.

Passenger statistics
In fiscal 2015, the station was used by an average of 842 passengers daily (boarding passengers only).

Surrounding area

Ikeda High School
Ikeda Onsen

See also
 List of Railway Stations in Japan

References

External links

 

Railway stations in Gifu Prefecture
Railway stations in Japan opened in 1913
Stations of Yōrō Railway
Ikeda, Gifu